The 2006 Mecklenburg-Vorpommern state election was held on 17 September 2006 to elect the members of the 5th Landtag of Mecklenburg-Vorpommern. The incumbent coalition government of the Social Democratic Party (SPD) and Party of Democratic Socialism (PDS) led by Minister-President Harald Ringstorff was returned with a reduced majority. However, the SPD chose not to continue the coalition. They instead formed a grand coalition with the Christian Democratic Union (CDU). Ringstorff was subsequently re-elected as Minister-President.

Issues and campaign
The economy was a major issue throughout the campaign. Mecklenburg-Vorpommern's unemployment rate was among the worst in Germany. The possibility of the far-right NPD entering the parliament also became an issue late in the campaign, with all established parties condemning it.

Parties
The table below lists parties represented in the 4th Landtag of Mecklenburg-Vorpommern.

Opinion polling

Election result

|-
|colspan=8 align=center| 
|-
! colspan="2" | Party
! Votes
! %
! +/-
! Seats 
! +/-
! Seats %
|-
| bgcolor=| 
| align=left | Social Democratic Party (SPD)
| align=right| 247,312
| align=right| 30.2
| align=right| 10.4
| align=right| 23
| align=right| 10
| align=right| 32.4
|-
| bgcolor=| 
| align=left | Christian Democratic Union (CDU)
| align=right| 235,530
| align=right| 28.8
| align=right| 2.6
| align=right| 22
| align=right| 3
| align=right| 31.0
|-
| bgcolor=| 
| align=left | Party of Democratic Socialism (PDS)
| align=right| 137,253
| align=right| 16.8
| align=right| 0.4
| align=right| 13
| align=right| 0
| align=right| 18.3
|-
| bgcolor=| 
| align=left | Free Democratic Party (FDP)
| align=right| 78,440
| align=right| 9.6
| align=right| 4.9
| align=right| 7
| align=right| 7
| align=right| 9.9
|-
| bgcolor=| 
| align=left | National Democratic Party (NPD)
| align=right| 59,845
| align=right| 7.3
| align=right| 6.5
| align=right| 6
| align=right| 6
| align=right| 8.5
|-
! colspan=8|
|-
| bgcolor=| 
| align=left | Alliance 90/The Greens (Grüne)
| align=right| 27,642
| align=right| 3.4
| align=right| 0.8
| align=right| 0
| align=right| ±0
| align=right| 0
|-
| bgcolor=orange| 
| align=left | Family Party (Familie)
| align=right| 9,463
| align=right| 1.2
| align=right| 1.2
| align=right| 0
| align=right| ±0
| align=right| 0
|-
| bgcolor=|
| align=left | Others
| align=right| 22,756
| align=right| 2.8
| align=right| 
| align=right| 0
| align=right| ±0
| align=right| 0
|-
! align=right colspan=2| Total
! align=right| 818,061
! align=right| 100.0
! align=right| 
! align=right| 71
! align=right| ±0
! align=right| 
|-
! align=right colspan=2| Voter turnout
! align=right| 
! align=right| 59.2
! align=right| 11.4
! align=right| 
! align=right| 
! align=right| 
|}

References

Sources
 Election Results from the Landtag of Mecklenburg - Western Pomerania 
 Landtagswahl Mecklenburg-Vorpommern 

2006 elections in Germany
2006
2000s in Mecklenburg-Western Pomerania